The 2022 Orange, County, California District Attorney election was held on June 7, 2022.

Incumbent District Attorney Todd Spitzer ran for a second term. Spitzer was first elected in 2014 with 53.2% of the vote in 2018.

Because Spitzer got a majority of the vote in the first round, he avoided a runoff and won a second term in the first round.

Candidates
 Note: County elections in California are officially nonpartisan. The parties below identify which party label each candidate would have run under if given the option.

Declared
 Bryan Chehock, federal attorney (No party preference)
 Pete Hardin, attorney (Democratic Party)
 Michael A. Jacobs, attorney (Republican Party)
 Todd Spitzer, incumbent District Attorney (Republican Party)

General election

Results

Results by county supervisorial district
Spitzer won all five county supervisorial districts by varying margins. Red represents county supervisorial districts won by Spitzer.

References

External links
Official campaign websites
 Bryan Chehock for District Attorney
 Pete Hardin for District Attorney
 Michael A. Jacobs for District Attorney
 Todd Spitzer for District Attorney

Orange County District Attorney
Orange County District Attorney
Orange County District Attorney